I Belong to You may refer to:

 I Belong to You (album) or the title song, by Emilia Mitiku, 2013
 "I Belong to You" (Caro Emerald song), 2013
 "I Belong to You" (Gina G song), 1996
 "I Belong to You" (Lenny Kravitz song), 1998
 "I Belong to You" (Love Unlimited song), 1974
 "I Belong to You" (Nikki Sudden song), 1991
 "I Belong to You" (Toni Braxton song), 1994
 "I Belong to You" (Whitney Houston song), 1992
 "I Belong to You (Every Time I See Your Face)", by Rome, 1997
 "I Belong to You (Il Ritmo della Passione)", by Eros Ramazzotti and Anastacia, 2006
 "I Belong to You (+Mon Cœur S'ouvre a ta Voix)", by Muse from The Resistance, 2009

See also 
 You Belong to Me (disambiguation)